Neglected Aspects of Sufi Study is a book by the writer Idries Shah published by Octagon Press in 1977. A later edition was published in 2002.

Shortly before he died, Shah stated that his books form a complete course that could fulfil the function he had fulfilled while alive. As such, Neglected Aspects of Sufi Study can be read as part of a whole course of study.

Content

Based on university lectures at the New School for Social Research, New York, and the University of California, San Francisco, Neglected Aspects of Sufi Study deals with many of the problems of Sufic methods of study and those which militate against its effective progress in the modern world; notably the unrecognised assumptions which we make about ourselves and about learning and its process.

Reception

Neglected Aspects of Sufi Study was favourably received, the Books and Bookmen review commenting that; “It elaborates points found difficult in our culture because of sets of mind.”
Asian Affairs wrote that it “contains serious warnings about the dangers of facile cult-formation”, while the Psychology Today review described the book as “an extraordinarily effective learning tool.”

References

External links
 Official Idries Shah website
 Octagon Press website

Sufi literature
Books by Idries Shah
1977 books